Ellerby may refer to:

Ellerby, East Riding of Yorkshire
Ellerby, North Yorkshire
New Ellerby, East Riding of Yorkshire

See also
 Ellerbee, a surname